Dirk Jozef Alfons Fransaer (born 9 August 1958 in Dendermonde) is a Belgian engineer and director of the Flemish Institute for Technological Research in Mol, Belgium.

He graduated as a civil engineer at the University of Ghent (Ghent) in 1980 and as biomedical engineer at the Katholieke Universiteit Leuven (Leuven) in 1985.

Honours 
 2010: Member of the Royal Flemish Academy of Belgium for Science and the Arts
 2012: Commander in the Order of Leopold.
 2014: Fray International Sustainability Award, SIPS 2014

Notes

1958 births
Living people
20th-century Belgian engineers
Ghent University alumni
People from Dendermonde
Members of the Royal Flemish Academy of Belgium for Science and the Arts
21st-century Belgian engineers